The 2011 Bedford Borough Council election took place on 5 May 2011 to elect members of Bedford Borough Council in Bedfordshire, England. All 40 seats of the council were up for election and the council stayed under no overall control.

After the election, the composition of the council (with change) was:
Labour 12 (+5)
Liberal Democrat 12 (−1)
Conservative 12 (+4)
Independent 4 (−4)

Results
Individual gains and losses are not given due to boundary changes.

By ward
Elected candidates in bold.

In multi-member wards, "majority" is the margin of votes between the lowest placed elected candidate and the highest placed non-elected candidate.

Brickhill

Bromham and Biddenham

Castle

Cauldwell

Clapham

De Parys

Eastcotts

Elstow

Goldington

Great Barford

Harpur

Harrold

Kempston Central and East

Kempston North

Kempston Rural

Kempston South

Kempston West

Kingsbrook

Newnham

Oakley

Putnoe

Queens Park

Riseley

Sharnbrook

Wilshamstead

Wootton

Wyboston

References

2011
2011 English local elections
21st century in Bedfordshire